Dmitriy Vasilyevich Karpov (Дмитрий Васильевич Карпов; born 23 July 1981 in Karaganda) is an athlete from Kazakhstan who competes in decathlon and heptathlon (the latter during the winter season). He won the bronze medal in the 2004 Summer Olympics.

Achievements

Personal bests

Outdoor 
100 metres – 10.50 (2004)
200 metres – 21.65 (2003)
400 metres – 46.81 (2004)
1500 metres – 4:32.34 (2006)
110 metres hurdles – 13.93 (2002)
High jump – 2.12 (2003)
Pole vault – 5.30 (2008)
Long jump – 8.05 (2002)
Shot put – 16.95 (2010)
Discus throw – 52.80 (2004)
Javelin throw – 60.31 (2006)
Decathlon – 8725 (2004) (AR)

Indoor
60 metres – 7.04 (2004)
1000 metres – 2:42.34 (2004)
60 metres hurdles – 7.79 (2003)
High jump – 2.11 (2002)
Pole vault – 5.20 (2008)
Long jump – 7.99 (2004)
Shot put – 16.26 (2012)
Heptathlon – 6229 (2008) (AR)

References

1981 births
Living people
Sportspeople from Karaganda
Kazakhstani decathletes
Athletes (track and field) at the 2004 Summer Olympics
Athletes (track and field) at the 2008 Summer Olympics
Athletes (track and field) at the 2012 Summer Olympics
Olympic athletes of Kazakhstan
Olympic bronze medalists for Kazakhstan
Asian Games medalists in athletics (track and field)
Kazakhstani people of Russian descent
World Athletics Championships medalists
Athletes (track and field) at the 2002 Asian Games
Athletes (track and field) at the 2006 Asian Games
Athletes (track and field) at the 2010 Asian Games
Athletes (track and field) at the 2014 Asian Games
Medalists at the 2004 Summer Olympics
Asian Games gold medalists for Kazakhstan
Asian Games silver medalists for Kazakhstan
Olympic bronze medalists in athletics (track and field)
Medalists at the 2002 Asian Games
Medalists at the 2006 Asian Games
Medalists at the 2010 Asian Games
21st-century Kazakhstani people